The Hotel Normandie is a historic boutique hotel within what is now Koreatown, Los Angeles.  It is located at 605 S. Normandie Ave.  It has 92 guest rooms and suites. It was built in 1926 in the Wilshire district in the Renaissance Revival style and was designed by Walker & Eisen, the firm of Los Angeles architects Percy A. Eisen and Albert R. Walker.

Author Malcolm Lowry wrote a significant portion of the novel Under the Volcano while residing at the hotel. Under the Volcano is now listed at #11 on Modern Library's list of 100 Best Novels.

The hotel was listed as Los Angeles Historic-Cultural Monument #1013 in 2012 by the Cultural Heritage Commission City of Los Angeles.

History

In March 1925, plans for the four-story store and hotel building were prepared for Karl Elliot by Architects Walker & Eisen. It was projected to cost $200,000 and would have stores on the first floor, with a hundred rooms on the upper floors. In 1931, it was selected as the official hotel for Stanford University alumni, as well as the University of Southern California and the University of California Los Angeles.

In 1964, a $250,000 modernization took place, scheduled by Paul and Adelaide Stockhammer. They purchased the building from the Hotel Normandie Ltd for more than $750,000. The Stockhammers had operated hotels and motels in New York, Massachusetts, and Florida, according to John Barbary, a real estate broker who represented the purchasers.

In the late 1970s, the hotel became the Normandie Wilshire Retirement Hotel.

References

Hotels in Los Angeles
Koreatown, Los Angeles
Los Angeles Historic-Cultural Monuments
Hotels established in 1925
Hotel buildings completed in 1925
1925 establishments in California